Breznica may refer to: 

Croatia
 Breznica, Croatia, a village and municipality in Varaždin county
 Breznica Đakovačka, a village near Đakovo
 Breznica Našička, a village near Našice

Serbia
 Breznica (Bujanovac), a village
 Breznica (Žagubica), a village

Slovakia
 Breznica, Stropkov District, Prešov Region

Slovenia
 Breznica pod Lubnikom, a village in the Municipality of Škofja Loka
 Breznica pri Žireh, a village in the Municipality of Žiri
 Breznica, Prevalje, a village in the Municipality of Prevalje
 Breznica, Žirovnica, a village in the Municipality of Žirovnica

See also
 Breznička (disambiguation)